Oheneba Kow Aduako Richardson (born 3 November 1925) was a Ghanaian politician who was a member of the first parliament of the second Republic of Ghana. He represented Gomoa-Akyempim constituency under the membership of the progress party (PP).

Early life and education 
Oheneba was born on 3 November 1925. He attended Agona Swedru Methodist and A.M.E. Zion School, where he obtained his Senior Secondary School Certificate and later worked as an administrator before going into Parliament.

Politics 
Richardson began his political career in 1969 when he became the parliamentary candidate for the Progress Party (PP) to represent his constituency in the Central Region of Ghana prior to the commencement of the 1969 Ghanaian parliamentary election.

Richardson was sworn into the First Parliament of the Second Republic of Ghana on October 1, 1969, after being pronounced winner at the 1969 Ghanaian election held on 26 August 1969. His tenure of office ended on 13 January 1972.

Personal life 
Richardson is a Methodist.

References 

1925 births
Possibly living people
Ghanaian Methodists
Ghanaian MPs 1969–1972
People from Central Region (Ghana)
Progress Party (Ghana) politicians